Guy Edouard de Huertas (10 January 1926 – 2 March 1997) was a French alpine skier who competed in the 1948 Winter Olympics and in the 1952 Winter Olympics.

References

1926 births
1997 deaths
Sportspeople from Nice
French male alpine skiers
Olympic alpine skiers of France
Alpine skiers at the 1948 Winter Olympics
Alpine skiers at the 1952 Winter Olympics